Alī al-Alā (d.1419) was a follower of Fazlallah Astarabadi and a prominent proponent of Hurufism. He had a prodigious literary output and is esteemed by the  Bektashi as the missionary who brought Astarabadi material to them.

Works
 Book of the Divine Footstool

References

Further reading
 
 

1419 deaths
Hurufi
Year of birth unknown
Date of death unknown